The Early Singles or Early Singles may refer to:
The Early Singles (Pink Floyd album), 1992
The Early Singles (Celine Dion album), 1999
Early Singles (Rational Youth album), 2000
Early Singles (Trouble Funk album), 1997